Vladimir Borisovich Sochnov (born 25 September 1955) is a former Soviet Russian professional football player.

Honours
 Soviet Top League champion: 1989.
 Soviet Top League runner-up: 1981, 1983, 1984, 1985.
 Soviet Top League bronze: 1982.
 Soviet Cup winner: 1986.

External links
 

1955 births
Footballers from Moscow
Living people
Soviet footballers
Russian footballers
Association football defenders
FC Spartak Moscow players
FC Torpedo Moscow players
PFC Krylia Sovetov Samara players
FC Spartak Vladikavkaz players
FC Asmaral Moscow players
Soviet Top League players
FC Znamya Truda Orekhovo-Zuyevo players